Silver Beach Provincial Park is a provincial park in British Columbia, Canada, located at the head of the Seymour Arm of Shuswap Lake in that province's Shuswap Country, adjacent to the settlement of Seymour Arm.

References

Parks in the Shuswap Country
Provincial parks of British Columbia
Protected areas established in 1969
1969 establishments in British Columbia